Kate Carolan (born 25 September 1982) is an Irish-American news reporter and radio presenter employed by Raidió Teilifís Éireann (RTÉ). Having lived in Lansing, Michigan, she reported for the Greater Lansing Business Monthly. In the past she has been dispatched by RTÉ Television to a number of remote locations such as Ethiopia, Somalia and Oxegen 2006. Carolan is currently 31 years of age and reads the news on the national broadcaster's radio station RTÉ 2fm. She received a Bachelor of Arts in Journalism from Michigan State University (MSU) and  possesses a "deep feminine voice, mature and sophisticated". She is married to 98FM DJ Ray Foley.

References

1982 births
Living people
Mass media people from Dublin (city)
RTÉ newsreaders and journalists
Irish women radio presenters
Irish women journalists
SPIN 1038 presenters